Pachitla Creek is a stream in the U.S. state of Georgia. It is a tributary to Ichawaynochaway Creek.

Pachitla is a name derived from a Native American language meaning either "dead pigeon", "pigeon town" or "opossum".

References

Rivers of Georgia (U.S. state)
Rivers of Calhoun County, Georgia
Rivers of Randolph County, Georgia